Yurac Apacheta (possibly from Quechua yuraq white, Aymara apachita the place of transit of an important pass in the principal routes of the Andes; name for a stone cairn in the Andes, a little pile of rocks built along the trail in the high mountains) is a mountain in the Andes of Peru, about  high. It is situated in the Arequipa Region, Arequipa Province, Yura District, and in the Caylloma Province, Huanca District.

References

Mountains of Arequipa Region
Mountains of Peru